Robbin is an unincorporated community in Teien Township, Kittson County, Minnesota, United States.

The community is located along the Red River, near Drayton, North Dakota.  It is located along State Highway 11 (MN 11) near its junction with State Highway 220 (MN 220) and Kittson County Road 7.  Nearby places also include Donaldson and Kennedy.

References

Unincorporated communities in Kittson County, Minnesota
Unincorporated communities in Minnesota